This article lists events from the year 1989 in Peru.

Incumbents

 President: Alan García (1985–1990) 
 Vice President of Peru: Luis Alberto Sánchez (1985–1990)
 Prime Minister:
Armando Villanueva (17 May 1988—15 May 1989}
Luis Alberto Sánchez (15 May 1989—30 September 1989)
Guillermo Larco Cox (30 September 1989—28 July 1990)

Events
 Agenda Diplomática magazine is first published.

References

External links

 
1980s in Peru
Years of the 20th century in Peru
Peru
Peru